Stefano Angeleri (26 August 1926 – 31 January 2012) was an Italian footballer and coach.

References

External links

1926 births
2012 deaths
Italian footballers
Association football midfielders
Serie A players
Serie B players
A.S.D. AVC Vogherese 1919 players
Juventus F.C. players
Atalanta B.C. players
Italian football managers
Atalanta B.C. managers
Parma Calcio 1913 managers
Modena F.C. managers
U.S. Cremonese managers
Casale F.B.C. managers
Piacenza Calcio 1919 managers
Calcio Lecco 1912 managers
U.S.D. 1913 Seregno Calcio managers
Acqui U.S. 1911 players
People from Castellazzo Bormida
A.C.D. Sant'Angelo 1907 managers
Footballers from Piedmont
Sportspeople from the Province of Alessandria